The 2016–17 NCAA football bowl games were a series of college football bowl games which completed the 2016 NCAA Division I FBS football season. The games began on December 17, 2016, and aside from the all-star games ended with the 2017 College Football Playoff National Championship which was played on January 9, 2017.

The total of 41 team-competitive postseason games in FBS, including the national championship game, was unchanged from the previous year. While bowl games had been the purview of only the very best teams for nearly a century, this was the eleventh consecutive year that teams with non-winning seasons participated in bowl games. To fill the 80 available team-competitive bowl slots, a new record of 20 teams (25% of all participants) with non-winning seasons participated in bowl games—17 had a .500 (6–6) season, and three losing teams with sub-.500 records (one 6–7 and two 5–7). This was the fifth time in six years that teams with actual losing records were invited to bowl games. None of the six teams that played in bowls on December 26 had a winning record.

Schedule
The schedule for the 2016–17 bowl games are below. All times are EST (UTC−5).

College Football Playoff and Championship Game
The College Football Playoff system was used to determine a national champion of Division I FBS college football. A 13-member committee of experts ranked the top 25 teams in the nation after each of the last seven weeks of the 2016 season. The top four teams in the final ranking then played a single-elimination semifinal round, with the winners advancing to the National Championship game.

The semi-final games were held at the Peach Bowl and the Fiesta Bowl as part of a yearly rotation of three pairs of six bowls. Their winners advanced to the 2017 College Football Playoff National Championship at Raymond James Stadium in Tampa, Florida, on January 9, 2017. As with the 2015 season, the two semi-final bowls were held on New Year's Eve (Saturday, December 31, 2016), as the Rose Bowl and Sugar Bowl are guaranteed exclusive TV time slots on January 2 if New Year's Day fell on a Sunday (there is a gentleman's agreement to not play New Year's Day bowl games against NFL games, which are played as usual when New Year's Day falls on a Sunday), regardless of whether they will be hosting a semifinal game.

To reduce the impact of the semi-final games' New Year's Eve scheduling—a factor that led to lower viewership of the 2015 semi-finals in comparison to 2014, it was announced on March 8, 2016, that the kickoff times of the two bowls would be pushed forward to 3:00 pm and 7:00 pm ET. CFP commissioner Bill Hancock suggested that starting the games earlier would allow viewers to partake in both the CFP games and New Year's festivities. As the earlier start intrudes on the early afternoon window for New Year's Six games, the 2016 Orange Bowl was instead held as a primetime game on December 30, 2016. As a result, the "New Year's Six" bowls were stretched across a period of four days, rather than two consecutive days of three games each. In July 2016, Hancock announced that future semi-finals, when not hosted by the Rose and Sugar Bowl games, will generally be held on the final Saturday of the year.

Of the Power Five conferences,  The Big Ten was represented with four teams in the New Year's Six, whereas the ACC, SEC and Pac-12 had two teams each. The Big 12 was again left out of the semifinals, and had just one team in the New Year's Six. The Group of 5 was represented by the MAC.

Non-CFP bowl games
On April 11, 2016, the NCAA announced a freeze on new bowl games until after the 2019 season. While bowl games had been the purview of only the very best teams for nearly a century, the NCAA had to lower its postseason eligibility criteria repeatedly (2006, 2009, 2010, 2012 and 2013), eventually allowing teams with losing records (5–7) to participate in bowls due to there being not enough bowl-eligible teams, while also having to allow teams from the same (Mountain West) conference to meet in the 2015 Arizona Bowl due to the lack of eligible teams to meet its other tie-ins. For the 2016–17 bowl season, 63% of the 128 teams playing in Division I FBS were deemed eligible and received invites to fill the 80 available slots.

Prior to the moratorium, multiple new bowl games were proposed for or approved to begin play in 2016, including one in Myrtle Beach, the Medal of Honor Bowl (which planned to convert itself from an all-star game to a sanctioned bowl after the NCAA lifted its ban on postseason championships at pre-determined locations in South Carolina), the Sun Belt/American Austin Bowl, and a Mountain West/Pac-12 bowl in Melbourne, Australia. The Sun Belt subsequently announced that it would become a new primary tie-in for the Arizona Bowl.

All-star games

FCS bowl game
The FCS has one bowl game; they also have a championship bracket that began on November 26 and ended on January 7.

Selection of the teams

CFP top 25 teams
On December 4, 2016, the College Football Playoff selection committee announced their final team rankings for the year:

In the third year of the College Football Playoff era, this was the first time that one of the four semifinalists (Ohio State) was not a conference champion.

Conference champions' bowl games
Only the Peach Bowl featured two conference champions playing against each other. Rankings are per the above CFP standings.

 denotes a conference that named co-champions

Bowl-eligible teams
ACC (11): Boston College, Clemson, Florida State, Georgia Tech, Louisville, Miami (FL), NC State, North Carolina, Pittsburgh, Virginia Tech, Wake Forest
American (7): Houston, Memphis, Navy, South Florida, Temple, Tulsa, UCF
Big Ten (10): Indiana,  Iowa, Maryland, Michigan, Minnesota, Nebraska, Northwestern, Ohio State, Penn State, Wisconsin
Big 12 (6): Baylor, Kansas State, Oklahoma, Oklahoma State, TCU, West Virginia
C-USA (7): Louisiana Tech, Middle Tennessee, North Texas (qualified via APR score), Old Dominion, Southern Miss, UTSA, Western Kentucky
MAC (6): Central Michigan, Eastern Michigan, Miami (OH), Ohio, Toledo, Western Michigan
Mountain West (7): Air Force, Boise State, Colorado State, Hawaii, New Mexico, San Diego State, Wyoming
Pac-12 (6): Colorado, Stanford, USC, Utah, Washington, Washington State
SEC (12): Alabama, Arkansas, Auburn, Florida, Georgia, Kentucky, LSU, Mississippi State (qualified via APR score), South Carolina, Tennessee, Texas A&M, Vanderbilt
Sun Belt (6): Appalachian State, Arkansas State, Idaho, Louisiana–Lafayette, South Alabama, Troy
Independent (2): Army, BYU

Number of bowl berths available: 80 
Number of bowl-eligible teams: 76 
Number of conditional bowl-eligible teams: 2 (Hawaii, South Alabama) 
Number of teams qualified by APR: 2 (North Texas, Mississippi State)

Bowl-ineligible teams
ACC (3):  Duke, Syracuse, Virginia
American (5): Cincinnati, East Carolina, SMU, Tulane, UConn
Big Ten (4):  Illinois, Michigan State, Purdue, Rutgers
Big 12 (4):  Iowa State, Kansas, Texas, Texas Tech
C-USA (6): Charlotte, FIU, Florida Atlantic, Marshall, Rice, UTEP
MAC (6):  Akron, Ball State, Bowling Green, Buffalo, Kent State, Northern Illinois
Mountain West (5): Fresno State, Nevada, San Jose State, Utah State, UNLV
Pac-12 (6):  Arizona, Arizona State, California, Oregon, Oregon State, UCLA
SEC (2): Missouri, Ole Miss
Sun Belt (5):  Georgia Southern, Georgia State, Louisiana–Monroe, New Mexico State, Texas State
Independent (2):  Notre Dame, UMass

Number of bowl-ineligible teams: 48

Note: Being bowl-ineligible does not, in itself, exclude a team from the chance to play in a bowl game. Tiebreaker procedures based on a school's Academic Progress Rate (APR) allowed for the possibility of 5–7 teams to play in bowl games since not enough teams qualified to fill all 80 spots with at least a 6–6 record.

Notes

References

Further reading